Michael Jenifer Stone (1747 – 1812) was an American planter and statesman from Charles County, Maryland. He represented Maryland in the United States House of Representatives.

Early life and education 
Stone was born to David and Elizabeth (Jenifer) Stone at Poynton Manor in Charles County. That home had been founded by his ancestor William Stone who had been the third Governor of the colony of Maryland in the mid-seventeenth century. His elder brother Thomas Stone signed the Declaration of Independence, and his younger brother John Hoskins Stone was the ninth governor of Maryland.

Career 
As an adult, Michael lived at Haberdeventure, which was the plantation of his brother Thomas near Port Tobacco. Michael married Mary Briscoe and they had five children. Their grandson, Frederick Stone, represented Maryland in the U.S. Congress. When Thomas died in 1787, his will gave Michael the lifetime use of Haberdeventure, and asked that he raise his young son.

Stone represented Charles County in the Maryland House of Delegates from 1781 to 1783. In 1788, he was a delegate to the states convention that ratified the U.S. Constitution. In the new Federal government, Stone represented Maryland's 1st congressional district in the First United States Congress from 1789 to 1791.

Personal life 
Stone died in 1812 and was buried on his own estate of Equality near La Plata in Charles County. His son, Michael Jenifer Stone (II), built the historic home Sunnyside at Aquasco, in Prince George's County, Maryland.

References

1747 births
1812 deaths
People from Charles County, Maryland
Members of the United States House of Representatives from Maryland
Members of the Maryland House of Delegates
American planters
People of colonial Maryland
Burials in Maryland
People from Port Tobacco Village, Maryland
Stone family
19th-century American Episcopalians
Jenifer family